Scullin may refer to:

In places:
 Scullin, Australian Capital Territory, a suburb of Canberra
 Division of Scullin, an electorate in the Australian House of Representatives

People with the surname Scullin:
 James Scullin (1876–1953), Prime Minister of Australia
 Frederick Scullin (born 1939), American judge
 Matthew L. Scullin (born 1983), American scientist

See also
 Scullin Monolith, rock outcrop in Antarctica
 Scullin Ministry, ministry of Australia, 1929–1932